Desa or DESA may refer to:

Desa
 Desa (band), an American rock band
 Desa (Bithynia), a Roman town of ancient Bithynia
 Desa (company), a Turkish leather goods producer and retailer
 Desa, Grand Prince of Serbia, a medieval Serbian ruler
 Desa, Dolj, a commune in Dolj County, Romania
 Desa (Indoesia), a type of village in Indonesia

DESA
 Iran Heavy Diesel Manufacturing Company (DESA), a manufacturer of diesel engines in Iran
 United Nations, Department of Economic and Social Affairs (UNDESA)
 Disney's Extreme Skate Adventure, a 2003 skateboarding video game
 Distinguished Eagle Scout Award, service award of the Boy Scouts of America
 Diplôme d'Études Supérieur Appliqué, a French educational degree
 Diplôme de l'École Spéciale d'Architecture, architectural degree earned in Paris, France

See also
 Desh (disambiguation)